Trude Charlotte Gimle (born 2 December 1974) is a Norwegian alpine skier. She was born in Aurskog. She competed at the 1994 and 1998 Winter Olympics .

References

External links

1974 births
Living people
People from Aurskog-Høland
Norwegian female alpine skiers
Olympic alpine skiers of Norway
Alpine skiers at the 1994 Winter Olympics
Alpine skiers at the 1998 Winter Olympics
Sportspeople from Viken (county)